Miradouro das Veredas is a monument in the Azores. It is located in Angra do Heroísmo, on the island of Terceira.

Angra do Heroísmo